The 1903 All-Western college football team consists of American football players selected to the All-Western teams chosen by various selectors for the 1903 Western Conference football season.

All-Western selections

Ends
 Curtis Redden, Michigan (BMA, BM-2, CIO-1, CRH, CT, FL-1, MJ-1, WC)
 Allen Abbott, Wisconsin (BMA, BM-1, CIO-1, CRH, CT, FL-2)
 Eddie Rogers, Minnesota (BMA, BM-1, CIO-2, FL-1, MJ-1, WC)
 James Irving Bush, Wisconsin (BM-2, MJ-2)
 Frank Longman, Michigan (MJ-2)
 Frederick A. Speik, Chicago (CIO-2, FL-2)

Tackles
 Joe Maddock, Michigan (BMA, BM-1, CIO-1, CRH, CT, FL-1, MJ-1, WC)
 Fred Schacht, Minnesota (BMA, BM-1, CIO-1, CRH, CT, FL-1, MJ-1, WC)
 Joe Curtis, Michigan (CIO-2, FL-2, MJ-2)
 Harry I. Allen, Northwestern (BM-2, MJ-2)
 Tiny Maxwell, Chicago (CIO-2)
 Thomas S. Hammond, Michigan (BM-2)
 Henry H. Kafir, Northwestern (FL-2)

Guards
 Robert Philips, Northwestern (BMA, CIO-1, CRH, FL-2, WC)
 Wilson Berthke, Wisconsin (BMA, BM-1, CIO-2, FL-1, MJ-1, WC)
 Walton Willard Thorp, Minnesota (BM-1, CIO-2, CT, MJ-1)
 Claude Rothgeb, Illinois (BMA, CIO-1, FL-1, MJ-2)
 Henry Schulte, Michigan (CT)
 Charles A. Fairweather, Illinois (CRH, FL-2)
 John B. Warren, Minnesota (BM-2, MJ-2)
 Pat Beacom, Notre Dame (BM-2)

Centers
 Moses Land Strathern, Minnesota (BMA, BM-1, CIO-1, CRH, FL-1, MJ-1, WC)
 George W. Gregory, Michigan (BM-2, CIO-2, CT, FL-2, MJ-2)

Quarterbacks
 Walter Eckersall, Chicago (BMA, BM-2, CIO-1, CT, FL-2, MJ-1) (CFH0F)
 Sigmund Harris, Minnesota (BM-1, CIO-2, CRH, FL-1, MJ-2, WC)

Halfbacks
 Willie Heston, Michigan (BMA, BM-1, CIO-1, CRH, CT, FL-1 [fullback], MJ-1, WC) (CFHOF)
 James B. Irsfield, Minnesota (BMA, CIO-2, CT, FL-1, MJ-2, WC)
 E. J. Vanderboom, Wisconsin (BM-1, FL-2, MJ-1)
 George Edward Schnur, Chicago (CIO-1, FL-1)
 Herb Graver, Michigan (CRH)
 Walter G. Diener, Illinois (BM-2, MJ-2)
 Zora G. Clevenger, Indiana (CIO-2) (CFHOF)
 Otto Nelson Davies, Minnesota (BM-2)

Fullbacks
Louis J. Salmon, Notre Dame (BMA, BM-1, CIO-1, CT, MJ-1, WC) (CFHOF)
 Mark Catlin Sr., Chicago (CIO-2, CRH, FL-2 [halfback], MJ-2)
 Earl Current, Minnesota (BM-2)
 Chauncey Colton, Northwestern (FL-2)

Key
BMA = Billy Mac, a team selected by aggregating the choices made by ten critics in St. Paul, Minneapolis, Milwaukee, Chicago and Detroit

BM = Billy Mac in The St. Paul Globe

CIO = Chicago Inter-Ocean

CRH = Chicago Record-Herald

CT = Chicago Tribune

FL = Fred Lowenthal, former star football player at University of Illinois

MJ = The Minneapolis Journal

WC = Walter Camp

CFHOF = College Football Hall of Fame

See also
1903 College Football All-America Team

References

All-Western team
All-Western college football teams